Réka Szikszay (born 3 August 1965) is a former professional tennis player from Hungary.

Biography
Szikszay represented Hungary at the 1986 Goodwill Games and played Fed Cup tennis for her country from 1986 to 1990. She appeared in a total of 13 ties and finished with a 14-9 overall win–loss record. Most effective in doubles, she was unbeaten in the five matches she partnered Andrea Temesvári in and lost only two of her 13 doubles fixtures.

She competed for a year on the WTA Tour, with her best performance coming at the 1989 Vitosha New Otani Open in Sofia, where she made the second round of the singles and was a doubles semifinalist, partnering Michaela Frimmelová.

Her only Grand Slam main-draw appearance came at the 1990 French Open, in the women's doubles competition with Caroline Vis. The pair were beaten in the second round by Betsy Nagelsen and Monica Seles.

ITF finals

Singles: 4 (1-3)

Doubles: 13 (7–6)

National representation

Fed Cup (14–9)

Singles (3–7)

Doubles (11–2)

References

External links
 
 
 

1965 births
Living people
Hungarian female tennis players
Competitors at the 1986 Goodwill Games